Florimond Vanhalme (21 March 1895 – 4 July 1979) was a Belgium football midfielder, who still is record Belgian international for Cercle Brugge, the team where he spent all of his career. After his playing career, Vanhalme stayed in football as coach.

Vanhalme debuted at the highest level on 5 May 1912, in a match against Excelsior Brussel. The match was won 1–4, with Vanhalme scoring once. One season later, Vanhalme was part of the squad that played the cup final against Union SG. After 90 minutes, the score was 2–2, and with no rules about what should be done, officials of the KBVB/URBSFA decided on the spot that extra time had to be played. This would be the first time in Belgian football history that a match would be decided this way. Union SG eventually won the match with 3–2.

Vanhalme was twice champion of Belgium with Cercle Brugge, in 1927 and in 1930. He also was called up for Belgium at the 1924 and 1928 Summer Olympics. He did not come into action in 1924. In 1928, he played the matches against Luxembourg and Argentina.

References

Sources
Roland Podevijn, Cercle Brugge 1899-1989, K.S.V. Cercle Brugge, 1989

External links
 Cerclemuseum.be 
 

1895 births
1979 deaths
Belgian footballers
Belgium international footballers
Cercle Brugge K.S.V. players
Association football midfielders
Footballers from Bruges
Belgian football managers
Cercle Brugge K.S.V. managers
Player-coaches
Belgian Pro League players
Olympic footballers of Belgium
Footballers at the 1924 Summer Olympics
Footballers at the 1928 Summer Olympics